Thomas Krammer (born 18 February 1983) is an Austrian football midfielder who plays for FSC Pöls.

Honours
Pasching
Austrian Cup: 2012–13

References

1983 births
Living people
Footballers from Graz
Austrian footballers

Association football midfielders
SK Sturm Graz players
FK Austria Wien players
FC Admira Wacker Mödling players
SK Vorwärts Steyr players
FC Juniors OÖ players
SV Grödig players
LASK players